Regional Science and Urban Economics is a bimonthly peer-reviewed academic journal covering urban economics and microeconomics in regards to regional phenomena. It was established in 1971 as Regional and Urban Economics, obtaining its current name in 1975. It is published by Elsevier and the editors-in-chief are Dan McMillen (University of Illinois at Urbana–Champaign), Yves Zenou (Stockholm University), and Giovanni Peri (University of California, Davis). According to the Journal Citation Reports, the journal has a 2014 impact factor of 1.006.

References

External links

Economics journals
Publications established in 1971
Bimonthly journals
English-language journals
Elsevier academic journals